Aweres is a local services board in the Canadian province of Ontario. Located in the Algoma District, it encompasses and provides services to most of the geographic township of Aweres, including the communities of Island Lake and Heyden.

The area northwest of Heyden is administered by the separate local services board of Peace Tree.

Heyden
Marie at the intersection of Highway 17 and Highway 556. The area is best known as a recreational resort, with skiing, snowmobile and all-terrain vehicle trails maintained by the Sault Trailblazers. There are many small lakes in Heyden, including Heyden Lake, Upper and Lower Island Lake, Redrock Lake, Finn Lake and Trout Lake, which are popular cottage country areas.

Heyden had one elementary school, Aweres Public School, which opened in 1963. The school was closed at the end of the 2014 school year. The school was a medium-sized (2,407 square metres or 25,910 square feet), single storey building and that served students from both Heyden and Searchmont. 
Students are now bused into Sault Ste Marie.

Island Lake

References

Communities in Algoma District
Local services boards in Ontario
Geographic townships in Ontario